General elections were held in the Netherlands Antilles on 22 January 2010. Voters elected the 22 members of the Estates, or parliament, of the Netherlands Antilles. It has been the country's last general election, as the Netherlands Antilles have ceased to exist as a country within the Kingdom of the Netherlands on 10 October 2010. At the time of the elections, the Netherlands Antilles consisted of the Caribbean islands of Bonaire, Curaçao, Saba, Sint Eustatius and Sint Maarten.

Background
The Council of Ministers of the Netherlands Antilles announced on 16 September 2009, that it had chosen 22 January 2010 as the official date for the upcoming general election. Voter registration for the election ended in November 2009. Antillean political parties who wish to contest the election must submit their list of candidates by the first week of December 2009.

There was some disagreement among politicians in the Netherlands Antilles as to the exact date of the upcoming election. Some politicians, including the Minister of Constitutional Affairs Roland Duncan, advocated an election date of 29 January 2010, instead. However, the 29 January date was ultimately rejected because the annual Tumba Festival also takes place on Curaçao on that date.

Glenn Sulvaran of the Curaçao based Party for the Restructured Antilles (PAR) argued against the original proposed 29 January date, noting that elections are not held during the carnival season on Sint Maarten or other islands, so the general election should not conflict with the Tumba Festival. Minister of Constitutional Affairs Roland Duncan rejected that argument, noting that the festival could be rescheduled for an event as important as a general election. Duncan criticized the perception that Curaçao's interests dominated those of other islands in the Netherlands Antilles, "Sometimes I have to wonder how serious we are. This is a prime example of how much of a farce the Netherlands Antilles is. What is best for Curaçao automatically has to be best for the other islands as well."

A date of 22 January 2010, was ultimately agreed upon by the Council of Ministers.

Results
On Curaçao, the PAR won the most seats, and were expected to form the next government.

References

Elections in the Netherlands Antilles
Netherlands
General election
Election and referendum articles with incomplete results